Fiona Lewis (born 28 September 1946) is a British actress and writer from Westcliff-on-Sea, Essex.

Biography
She is married to Art Linson, an American film producer, director, and screenwriter. In February 1967, she had an appearance in Playboy as part of the 13-page James Bond parody pictorial "The Girls of Casino Royale".

Lewis has written two books, the novel Between Men and the memoir Mistakes Were Made (Some In French). She has written for The New Yorker, the Los Angeles Times, and The Observer. Her blog, Fiona's French Chateau, includes information about her French chateau, stories about London and Paris in the 1960s, Los Angeles in the 1970s, and her time working as an actress.

Partial filmography

References

External links
 
 
 

1946 births
Living people
People from Westcliff-on-Sea
British film actresses
Place of birth missing (living people)
Writers from Essex
English memoirists
British women memoirists